Guoliang may refer to the following Chinese names:

places
town
 Guoliang, Chongqing (国梁镇), a town of Dazu District in Chongqing Municipality.

villages, written as "郭亮村"
 Guoliang Village (郭亮村), a village of Tongguan Subdistrict in Wangcheng District, Changsha City, Hunan Province.
 Guoliang, Huixian (郭亮村), a village in Huixian City, Henan Province.

other place
 Guoliang Tunnel (郭亮洞), a tunnel links the village of Guoliang, Huixian to the outside through the Taihang Mountains.

names of people
names of Chinese people, written as "郭亮"
 see Guo Liang (disambiguation)